List of Registered Historic Places in East Greenwich, Rhode Island, which has been transferred from and is an integral part of National Register of Historic Places listings in Kent County, Rhode Island

|}

See also

National Register of Historic Places listings in Kent County, Rhode Island
List of National Historic Landmarks in Rhode Island

References

N
.
.East Greenwich
East Greenwich
East Greenwich, Rhode Island